Eleutherodactylus maurus (common names: brown peeping frog, dusky chirping frog) is a species of frog in the family Eleutherodactylidae. It is endemic to central Mexico and known from the southeastern Michoacán to Mexico, and Morelos states.

Taxonomy
The species was described in 1955 as Tomodactylus fuscus. However, when transferred to the genus Eleutherodactylus, its name became a secondary homonym of Eleutherodactylus fuscus. The current name, Eleutherodactylus maurus, is a replacement name (nomen novum) created to remedy this situation.

Description
Specimens in the type series measured  in snout–vent length. The overall coloration is dark brown. The dorsum bears scattered pustules. The tympanum is small and inconspicuous. The forearms are slender and hands relatively small. The tips of the two outer fingers are expanded and truncate.

Male advertisement call is a single "peep" given at long intervals.

Habitat and conservation
The species' natural habitats are pine forests with abundant rocks and leaf-litter. They were found at night calling from the tops of rocks and off the ground in small bushes, or in one case, in the daytime under a rock.

Eleutherodactylus maurus is an uncommon and poorly known species that is threatened by habitat loss and disturbance caused by expansion of urbanized areas. Mexican law protects it under the "Special Protection" category.

References

maurus
Fauna of the Trans-Mexican Volcanic Belt
Endemic amphibians of Mexico
Amphibians described in 1989
Taxa named by Stephen Blair Hedges
Taxonomy articles created by Polbot